William Francis Strudwick (May 12, 1770July 31, 1810) was a U.S. Congressman from the state of North Carolina between 1796 and 1797.

Strudwick, born at "Stag Park," near Wilmington, North Carolina in 1770, was a farmer with a limited education. In 1789, he was a delegate to the state constitutional convention; he also served in the North Carolina Senate in 1792 and 1793. In 1796, Strudwick was elected as a Federalist to the 4th United States Congress to fill the vacancy caused by the resignation of Rep. Absalom Tatom, and served from November 28, 1796 to March 3, 1797. In 1801, he joined the North Carolina House of Representatives, where he served until 1803. Strudwick died in 1810 and is buried in a private cemetery at Hawfields, North Carolina.

External links

1770 births
1810 deaths
Members of the North Carolina House of Representatives
North Carolina state senators
Federalist Party members of the United States House of Representatives from North Carolina
Politicians from Wilmington, North Carolina
18th-century American politicians
19th-century American politicians
Farmers from North Carolina